The Main Building School, on Sugartree St. in Wilmington, Ohio, was listed on the National Register of Historic Places in 1980. It was deemed a "fine example" of High Victorian Italianate architecture. It was opened in 1869 and was in continuous use as a school until 1979. The building may have since been demolished.

References

National Register of Historic Places in Clinton County, Ohio
Italianate architecture in Ohio
Buildings and structures completed in 1869